George Davie was an English footballer who played in the Football League for Everton.

Background
George Davie was signed by Everton to strengthen their attack.

League & Everton debut
Centre-forward was a problem position for Everton in 1888–89. He was the eighth player to play at centre-forward when he was picked to lead the attack against Burnley on 24 November 1888 at Anfield, Liverpool. Everton won the toss and played with the wind at their backs. It worked. Edgar Chadwick made it 1–0, J Coyne added the second and James Costley made it three via a deflection. Everton 3–0 Burnley at half-time. With the wind at their backs Burnley got into the game and reduced Everton's first-half lead to 3–2. There were chances at both ends but it finished Everton 3–2 Burnley.

Playing record
Davie played two in a row at centre-forward. However after the beating Everton took from West Bromwich Albion (4-1) at Anfield on 1 December 1888 Davie was dropped for the rest of the season. Everton finished eighth in the League scoring 35 goals, the second lowest tally by a League team in that first season.

After Everton
Davie left Everton in April 1889 and joined Sunderland. He never played top-flight football again.

References

1864 births
Date of death unknown
Scottish footballers
Everton F.C. players
Renton F.C. players
Sunderland A.F.C. players
Arsenal F.C. players
English Football League players
Association football forwards